The 2019–20 season was Newcastle Jets' 19th season since its establishment in 2000. The club participated in the A-League for the 15th time and FFA Cup for the sixth time.

On 24 March 2020, the FFA announced that the 2019–20 A-League season would be postponed until further notice due to the COVID-19 pandemic in Australia and New Zealand, and subsequently extended indefinitely.  The season resumed on 17 July 2020.

Players

Transfers

Transfers in

From youth squad

Transfers out

Contract extensions

Technical staff

Newcastle Jets started the season with Ernie Merrick as their head coach. Following bad results and sitting bottom of the table, Merrick was sacked in January 2020 and Newcastle Jets' W-League coach Craig Deans together with Qiang Li were appointed as caretaker coaches. A month later, Jets appointed Welshman Carl Robinson as the head coach, signing him on a 3.5 year contract. A week after his appointment, Robinson added Kenny Miller to the coaching staff. In June, Darren Bazeley was added to the coaching staff.

Squad statistics

Appearances and goals

{| class="wikitable sortable plainrowheaders" style="text-align:center"
|-
! rowspan="2" |
! rowspan="2" |
! rowspan="2" style="width:180px;" |Player
! colspan="2" style="width:87px;" |A-League
! colspan="2" style="width:87px;" |FFA Cup
! colspan="2" style="width:87px;" |Total
|-
!
!Goals
!
!Goals
!
!Goals
|-
|1
|GK
! scope="row" | Glen Moss

|8
|0

|0+1
|0

!9
!0
|-
|2
|DF
! scope="row" | Bobby Burns

|0+4
|0

|0
|0

!4
!0
|-
|3
|DF
! scope="row" | Jason Hoffman

|8
|1

|3
|0

!11
!1
|-
|4
|DF
! scope="row" | Nigel Boogaard

|3
|0

|0
|0

!3
!0
|-
|5
|MF
! scope="row" | Ben Kantarovski

|4+3
|0

|0
|0

!7
!0
|-
|6
|MF
! scope="row" | Steven Ugarkovic

|25
|4

|3
|0

!28
!4
|-
|8
|MF
! scope="row" | Wes Hoolahan

|0
|0

|2
|1

!2
!1
|-
|9
|FW
! scope="row" | Abdiel Arroyo

|5
|1

|2+1
|1

!8
!2
|-
|10
|FW
! scope="row" | Dimitri Petratos

|8
|2

|3
|3

!11
!5
|-
|11
|MF
! scope="row" | Nick Fitzgerald

|7+1
|0

|3
|1

!11
!1
|-
|14
|FW
! scope="row" | Kaine Sheppard

|0+1
|0

|1+1
|0

!3
!0
|-
|16
|DF
! scope="row" | Matthew Millar

|8
|2

|3
|0

!11
!2
|-
|18
|DF
! scope="row" | John Koutroumbis

|8
|0

|3
|1

!11
!1
|-
|19
|FW
! scope="row" | Kosta Petratos

|0+1
|0

|0+1
|0

!2
!0
|-
|20
|GK
! scope="row" | Lewis Italiano

|0
|0

|3
|0

!3
!0
|-
|22
|DF
! scope="row" | Lachlan Jackson

|5
|0

|1
|0

!6
!0
|-
|23
|MF
! scope="row" | Matthew Ridenton

|4+3
|0

|2+1
|0

!10
!0
|-
|25
|MF
! scope="row" | Jack Simmons

|0
|0

|0+1
|0

!1
!0
|-
|28
|DF
! scope="row" | Patrick Langlois

|0+3
|0

|2+1
|1

!6
!1
|-
|30
|GK
! scope="row" | Keegan Hughes

|0
|0

|0
|0

!0
!0
|-
|31
|FW
! scope="row" | Yeramakis Petratos

|0+1
|0

|0
|0

!1
!0
|-
|32
|MF
! scope="row" | Angus Thurgate

|4+4
|2

|1+2
|0

!11
!2
|-
|40
|GK
! scope="row" | Noah James

|0
|0

|0
|0

!0
!0
|-
|44
|DF
! scope="row" | Nikolai Topor-Stanley

|8
|0

|1+1
|0

!10
!0
|}

Disciplinary record

Clean sheets

Pre-season and friendlies

Competitions

Overview
{|class="wikitable" style="text-align:left"
|-
!rowspan=2 style="width:140px;"|Competition
!colspan=8|Record
|-
!style="width:30px;"|
!style="width:30px;"|
!style="width:30px;"|
!style="width:30px;"|
!style="width:30px;"|
!style="width:30px;"|
!style="width:30px;"|
!style="width:50px;"|
|-
|A-League

|-
|FFA Cup

|-
!Total

FFA Cup

A-League

League table

Results summary

Result by round

Matches

References

Newcastle Jets FC seasons
2019–20 A-League season by team